The Church of St Anthony of Padua, Oxford is a yellow brick-built Catholic church in suburb of Headington, east Oxford, Oxfordshire, England. The church building is located in Headley Way.

History
The church was built in 1960 and designed by Jennings, Homer & Lynch. J.R.R. Tolkien was a parishioner here when he lived in Sandfield Road nearby. He was also a benefactor and his Requiem Mass was held here on 6 September 1973.

See also
 Roman Catholic Archdiocese of Birmingham

References

External links
 St Anthony of Padua Parish from Archdiocese of Birmingham

Roman Catholic churches completed in 1960
1960 establishments in England
Churches in Oxford
Roman Catholic churches in Oxfordshire
J. R. R. Tolkien
20th-century Roman Catholic church buildings in the United Kingdom